Buckinghamshire County Cricket Club was established on 15 January 1891. It has since played minor counties cricket from 1895 and played List A cricket from 1965 to 2005, using a different number of home grounds during that time. Their first home minor counties fixture in 1895 was against Oxfordshire at The Big Field, Wolverton, while their first home List A match came 75 years later against Bedfordshire in the 1970 Gillette Cup at London Road, High Wycombe.

The 24 grounds that Buckinghamshire have used for home matches since 1895 are listed below, with statistics complete through to the end of the 2014 season.

Grounds

List A
Below is a complete list of grounds used by Buckinghamshire County Cricket Club when it was permitted to play List A matches. These grounds have also held Minor Counties Championship and MCCA Knockout Trophy matches.

Minor Counties
Below is a complete list of grounds used by Buckinghamshire Cricket Club in Minor Counties Championship and MCCA Knockout Trophy matches.

Notes

References

Buckinghamshire County Cricket Club
Cricket grounds in Buckinghamshire
Buckinghamshire